The Czech Supercup was an annual football match between the winners of the Czech First League and the Czech Cup, organised by the Czech Football Association. It was last sponsored by Synot Tip and was therefore officially known as the Synot Tip Supercup. The Czech Supercup was discontinued in 2015 and replaced by the Czechoslovak Supercup from 2017 onward.

The match was held at the home stadium of the league champion.

Winners
The first Supercup was held on 8 July 2010. The last Supercup was held on 18 June 2015.

1 Czech First League Runner-up competing instead of Czech Cup Winner, as the league winner won the Double.

Performance by club

References

External links

Supercup
Defunct national association football supercups
2010 establishments in the Czech Republic
Recurring sporting events established in 2010
Recurring sporting events disestablished in 2015